This is the complete bibliography of British science fiction author Stephen Baxter.

Xeelee Sequence

Destiny's Children 
The Destiny's Children series is part of the Xeelee Sequence.

NASA Trilogy

The Web Series 

Baxter contributed two books to this series for young adults. See The Web (series)

Manifold Trilogy

Mammoth Trilogy

A Time Odyssey (co-authored with Arthur C. Clarke)

Time's Tapestry

Flood/Ark

Northland Trilogy

The Long Earth (co-authored with Terry Pratchett)

Proxima

World Engines

Standalone Novels

Unrelated collections

Short fiction

Non-fiction

References

External links
Entry at isfdb.org

Bibliographies by writer
Bibliographies of American writers
Science fiction bibliographies